Akhtar Hossain Choudhury Memorial Degree College (AHCMC) is a degree college situated in Mirzaganj Upazila, Patuakhali District, Bangladesh. It was established in 2002 by Air Vice Marshal (Retd) Altaf Hossain Choudhury, former Home Minister and Begum Suraiya Akhtar Choudhury, in memoriam to his deceased son Akhtar Hossain. The college provides education under the national curriculum.

Campus 
The college is located in a suburban area, North frontier of Mirzagonj Upazila where Bakergonj Upazila bordar intersects. Dhaka-Barguna highway road runs along its front boundary wall. All buildings of the college are facing to the West creating a north–south long row standing side by side. Behind the academic buildings there is a lake along with a bridge over it. It covers almost one-third of the campus.

Uniform
For boys:
 Sky-blue shirt
 Black pant

For girls:
 Black salwar
 Black scarf
 Sky-blue kameez
 Sky-blue belt

References

Colleges in Patuakhali District
Educational institutions established in 2002